Leptura plebeja is a species of beetle in the family Cerambycidae. It was described by Randall in 1838.

References

Lepturinae
Beetles described in 1838